Yakov Moskachenkov (7 August 1916 – 1992) was a Soviet long-distance runner. He competed in the marathon at the 1952 Summer Olympics.

References

External links
 

1916 births
1992 deaths
Athletes (track and field) at the 1952 Summer Olympics
Soviet male long-distance runners
Soviet male marathon runners
Olympic athletes of the Soviet Union
Place of birth missing
Olympic male marathon runners